Paranthozela is a genus of moths originally placed in the tribe Enarmoniini of the subfamily Olethreutinae. However, some regard it as an unplaced genus within the family Tortricidae. 

The genus is contained within Ecuador. Paranthozela species have been found on both sides of the Andes.

Species
Paranthozela apicana (Razowski & Pelz, 2008)
Paranthozela calamistrana (Razowski & Wojtusiak, 2007)
Paranthozela lobulina (Razowski & Wojtusiak, 2007)
Paranthozela ochreomixtana (Razowski & Pelz, 2008)
Paranthozela parva (Razowski & Pelz, 2008)
Paranthozela polyasterina (Razowski & Wojtusiak, 2007)
Paranthozela propinquana (Razowski & Pelz, 2008)
Paranthozela spiloma (Razowski & Wojtusiak, 2007)
Paranthozela stilbia (Razowski & Wojtusiak, 2007)
Paranthozela supracalamistrana (Razowski & Pelz, 2008)
Paranthozela tandayapana (Razowski & Pelz, 2008)
Paranthozela zopheria (Razowski & Wojtusiak, 2007)

See also
List of Tortricidae genera

References

External links
tortricidae.com

Tortricidae genera
Enarmoniini